Michael Starrbury is an American screenwriter and producer known for his work on the film The Inevitable Defeat of Mister & Pete, and the television series Legends of Chamberlain Heights, When They See Us, and Colin in Black & White.

Career 
In 2009, Starrbury served as a panelist for .EDU Film Festival. In July 2013, he wrote the Lionsgate film The Inevitable Defeat of Mister & Pete. By May 2015, he scripted the Comedy Central series Legends of Chamberlain Heights. In July 2018, he was writing the series When They See Us, the first in three projects for Netflix. In August 2021, the second Netflix collaboration occurred when they hired Starrbury to write the screenplay for Colin in Black & White. In December 2021, the third Netflix project was revealed when Starrbury was hired to script their film adaptation of David F. Walker's comic, The Hated. In November 2022, Deadline Hollywood reported that Starrbury would be collaborating with Marvel Studios, having been set to script the reboot of Blade (2024).

Filmography

Accolades

References

External links 
 

21st-century American comedians
21st-century American male writers
21st-century American screenwriters
American comedy writers
American male screenwriters
American male television writers
American television writers
Living people
Place of birth missing (living people)
Year of birth missing (living people)
Showrunners